A. natans is an abbreviation that may refer to:
Ambulocetus natans, a fossil cetacean
Atractus natans, a snake
Aponogeton natans, a flowering plant
Alisma natans, now called Luronium natans, a flowering plant